Alderman's 20 Stores in One, also known as The Belk Building, is a historic commercial building located at Manning, Clarendon County, South Carolina. It was built in 1919, and is a two-story red brick building or two-part commercial block with a flat roof and parapets. The main façade of the building features a metal entablature supported by brackets and ornamented by recessed panels. Constructed by David W. Alderman, a wealthy Clarendon County lumber merchant and entrepreneur, the building was the first shopping mall in the county and is the largest storefront in the main business section of downtown Manning. Belk operated from the building from 1955 to the late-1980s.

It was listed in the National Register of Historic Places in 1994.

References

Commercial buildings on the National Register of Historic Places in South Carolina
Commercial buildings completed in 1919
Buildings and structures in Clarendon County, South Carolina
National Register of Historic Places in Clarendon County, South Carolina